Seamus Murphy, (15 July 1907 – 2 October 1975) was an Irish sculptor and stone carver, best known for designing the Church of the Annunciation, Blackpool, Cork. Examples of his unique carvings of statues, gravestones, monuments and plaques can be found around Ireland, particularly County Cork.

Life
The birth of James (Seamus) Murphy, and that of his twin brother John, is recorded at Fair Street, Mallow, County Cork, on 15 July 1907. His father, James Murphy, was a railway employee.

The 1911 census records the family, now with two further sons (Michael, b. 1909 and Bartholomew 5 days old when the census was taken on 2 April), living on Ballyhooley Road in Cork city.

He attended Saint Patrick's School on Gardiner's Hill where his teacher was Daniel Corkery who encouraged him to go to art school. He attended the Crawford School of Art and then took up an apprenticeship with a monumental sculptors' firm. He would, in time, go on to become a Royal Hibernian Academy professor of sculpture. In 1944 he married Maighread Higgins, daughter of the Cork sculptor Joseph Higgins, and they went on to have three children; the knitwear designer Bebhinn Marten, the novelist Orla Murphy and the painter and De Dannan member Colm Murphy. His studio/workshop was at Watercourse Road, Blackpool, Cork.

In the 1945 local elections, he ran unsuccessfully for the minor fascist party Ailtirí na hAiséirghe in Cork Corporation, taking 116 (0.42%) of first preference votes.

See also
 List of public art in Cork

References

External links
Official Website
The Silent Art, Louis Marcus

1907 births
1975 deaths
Irish sculptors
People from County Cork
20th-century sculptors